Federico Ezequiel Presedo (born 28 August 1992) is an Argentine professional footballer who plays as a midfielder for JJ Urquiza.

Career
Almirante Brown were Presedo's first club. He participated in the opening match of his career in Primera B Nacional on 23 September 2012 against Gimnasia y Esgrima, which was followed by his first goal versus Sarmiento in April 2013. Ten total appearances arrived in 2012–13, with Presedo receiving a red card against Patronato in his last game. Almirante Brown suffered relegation in 2013–14, with Presedo going on to participate twenty-one times in Primera B Metropolitana up to 2015. Presedo left to join Fénix midway through the year. He remained for three campaigns whilst scoring ten goals in sixty-nine matches.

On 31 July 2017, Presedo was loaned to Primera B Nacional's Nueva Chicago for 2017–18 and 2018–19. He featured just four times in the former, all of which were off the substitutes bench, after suffering a cruciate ligament injury.

Career statistics
.

References

External links

1992 births
Living people
People from Morón Partido
Argentine footballers
Association football midfielders
Primera Nacional players
Primera B Metropolitana players
Club Almirante Brown footballers
Club Atlético Fénix players
Nueva Chicago footballers
Club Atlético Atlanta footballers
Sportspeople from Buenos Aires Province